Vincent Pyke, born Vincent Pike, (4 February 1827 – 5 June 1894) was a 19th-century politician in Otago, New Zealand and Victoria, Australia.

Early life
Pyke was born in Shepton Mallet, Somerset, England as Vincent Pike. He married Frances Renwick on 7 September 1846 at Bristol, England; they had four sons and one daughter. He changed the spelling of his surname some time after their wedding.

Australia
Pyke and family went to Australia in 1851, first to South Australia and then the gold diggings in Victoria where he spent two years as a miner around  Forest Creek, Castlemaine and Fryer's Creek Bendigo and opened a store at Forest Creek. Pyke was elected to represent Castlemaine in the Victorian Legislative Council from November 1855 to March 1856 and Castlemaine Boroughs in the Victorian Legislative Assembly from November 1856 to February 1857 and again from October 1859 and June 1862.

In 1857, Pyke was appointed emigration agent in England in conjunction with the Right Hon. Hugh Childers.

New Zealand

In 1862 Pyke visited the Otago goldfields, and became Secretary or Commissioner of the goldfields for the Otago Provincial Council. He then moved to Dunstan and Clyde. He was the first Chairman of Vincent County, which was named after him following an ironic suggestion by an opponent.

He represented the electorates of Wakatipu –1875, then Dunstan 1875–1890. He then represented Tuapeka from 1893 to 1894 when he died. He was noted for his loyalty to Clyde and his Central Otago constituents.

Pyke was also a journalist, and wrote two novels about life on the goldfields, Wild Will Enderby (1873) and The Adventures of George Washington Pratt (1874).

Death
Pyke died at Lawrence, Otago, and is buried in the Dunedin Northern Cemetery.

References

External links
five works by Pyke from the New Zealand Electronic Text Centre
Cartoon of Vincent Pyke in New Zealand Parliament

1827 births
1894 deaths
Members of the New Zealand House of Representatives
New Zealand MPs for South Island electorates
New Zealand Liberal Party MPs
New Zealand public servants
Local politicians in New Zealand
Members of the Victorian Legislative Council
Members of the Victorian Legislative Assembly
Burials at Dunedin Northern Cemetery
People from Shepton Mallet
Unsuccessful candidates in the 1890 New Zealand general election
19th-century Australian politicians
19th-century New Zealand politicians
19th-century Australian public servants
People of the Otago Gold Rush